El Supremo or il Supremo ("the supreme one" in Spanish and Italian respectively) may refer to:

 José Gaspar Rodríguez de Francia (1766–1840), Paraguayan dictator
 Pasquale Condello (born 1950), leader of the Italian 'Ndrangheta crime organization
 El Supremo (wrestler) (1942–2010), ring name of Mexican professional wrestler Salvador Cuevas Ramírez
 El Supremo, a fictional character in the Horatio Hornblower novel The Happy Return (1937)

See also
Supremo (disambiguation)